"Hard Livin'" is a song written by David Halley, and recorded by American country music artist Keith Whitley.  It was released in March 1987 as the fifth single from the album L.A. to Miami.  The song reached number 10 on the Billboard Hot Country Singles & Tracks chart.

Chart performance

References

1987 singles
1986 songs
Keith Whitley songs
RCA Records singles